The 1984 Asian Taekwondo Championships were the 6th edition of the Asian Taekwondo Championships, and were held in Manila, Philippines from 9 to 11 November, 1984.

Medal summary

Medal table

References

Results

External links
Results

Asian Championships
Asian Taekwondo Championships
Asian Taekwondo Championships
Taekwondo Championships